Yasuomi is a masculine Japanese given name.

Possible writings
Yasuomi can be written using many different combinations of kanji characters. Here are some examples:

靖臣, "peaceful, retainer"
康臣, "healthy, retainer"
安臣, "tranquil, retainer"
保臣, "preserve, retainer"
泰臣, "peaceful, retainer"
八洲臣, "8, continent, retainer"
易臣, "divination, retainer"

The name can also be written in hiragana やすおみ or katakana ヤスオミ.

Notable people with the name

, Japanese footballer
, Japanese samurai
, Japanese kickboxer
, Japanese animator

Japanese masculine given names